Franco Masetto (born July 10, 1942 in Sesto San Giovanni) was an Italian professional football player.

1942 births
Living people
People from Sesto San Giovanni
Italian footballers
Serie A players
Inter Milan players
Ascoli Calcio 1898 F.C. players
A.C. Cesena players
S.S.D. Lucchese 1905 players
A.S.D. Victor San Marino players
Calcio Montebelluna players
Association football midfielders
Footballers from Lombardy
Sportspeople from the Metropolitan City of Milan